Deep Creek is stream in Tooele County, Utah, USA.

References 

Great Salt Lake Desert
Rivers of Tooele County, Utah